Rasbora rheophila is a species of ray-finned fish in the genus Rasbora. It is endemic to the Sungai Pangakatan in Sabah.

References 

Rasboras
Freshwater fish of East Malaysia
Fish described in 2012
Taxa named by Maurice Kottelat